Itakura Katsuaki may refer to:

Itakura Katsuaki (Bitchu-Matsuyama) (1801–1804), daimyō of Bitchū-Matsuyama Domain
Itakura Katsuaki (Fukushima) (1814-1877), daimyō of Fukushima Domain

See also
Itakura clan